The name Shirley has been used to name nine tropical cyclones in the western Pacific Ocean and one tropical cyclone in the Australian basin.

In the Western Pacific Ocean:
 Tropical Storm Shirley (1952)
 Typhoon Shirley (1957)
 Typhoon Shirley (1960)
 Typhoon Shirley (1963)
 Super Typhoon Shirley (1965)
 Typhoon Shirley (1968)
 Typhoon Shirley (1971)
 Typhoon Shirley (1974)
 Tropical Storm Shirley (1978)

In the Australian region:
 Cyclone Shirley (1966)

Pacific typhoon set index articles